Don Backy (real name Aldo Caponi; born 21 August 1939) is an Italian singer, songwriter and actor. He collaborated with Sofia Rotaru for "Grey Bird" – Ukrainian version of Italian song "L'immensità"— "Сизокрилий птах".

Selected songs
"L'obra del sole" (1962)
"L'Amore" (1966)
"L'immensità" (1967)

Selected filmography
The Monk of Monza by Sergio Corbucci (1963)
Super rapina a Milano by Adriano Celentano (1964)
Bandits in Milan (also known as The Violent Four) by Carlo Lizzani (1968)
The Seven Cervi Brothers by Gianni Puccini (1968)
Satyricon by Gian Luigi Polidoro (1969)
Rabid Dogs by Mario Bava (1974)
Impotenti esistenziali by Giuseppe Cirillo (2009)

Notes and references

External links
Official site

Italian male singers
Italian male film actors
People from Santa Croce sull'Arno
1939 births
Living people